The Master of the Castello Nativity was an Italian religious artist of the mid-15th century. He was a follower of Fra' Filippo Lippi and was probably employed at his workshop in Prato.

Works

He specialized in paintings for devotional purposes, featuring the Virgin and Child or related scenes. Typically characteristic of his work are the variations in placement and pose of the Child in the Virgin's arms; something which is generally more static.

In 1995, Chiara Lachi, of the Marino Marini Museum, identified him as the young Piero di Cosimo, a proposal that has received little agreement. That work is now divided between museums in Prato, London and Philadelphia.

References

Bibliography
 Andrea De Marchi e Cristina Gnoni Mavarelli (a cura di), Da Donatello a Lippi, Officina pratese, catalogo della mostra, Skira, Milano 2013.

External links

 Castello Nativity @ the National Gallery

15th-century Italian painters
Religious artists
Castello Nativity